The Duiyue Gate or Laoshi City Gate and Laogu Stone Urn City Wall is a historical gate in West Central District, Tainan, Taiwan.

Name
The name Duiyue comes from the direction of Dui of Bagua diagram.

History
The construction of the gate started in 1835 and was completed in January 1836 during Qing Dynasty rule. It was part of the three gates built during the expansion of Tainan westward towards Taiwan Strait by building outer walls for the defense of the town from Qing Dynasty after the Revolt of Jhang Bing in 1832.

Architecture
The base of the gate was built using cut coral stones, therefore earning the nickname Coral Stone Outer Gate. It is constructed with red bricks with 4 meters in height and 3 meters in width. The entrance gate is 3 meters in width with a round arch at its top. There is also a staircase inside the gate to access the top of the wall.

See also
 List of tourist attractions in Taiwan

References

1836 establishments in Taiwan
Gates in Tainan
National monuments of Taiwan